Orji is a surname. Notable people with the surname include:

Ebere Orji (born 1992), Nigerian footballer
Felix Orji (born 1962), Nigerian-American Anglican bishop
Joseph Orji (born 1954), Nigerian military governor
Josephine Orji (born 1979), Nigerian powerlifter
Keturah Orji (born 1996), American track and field athlete
Penn Orji (born 1991), Nigerian footballer
Theodore Orji (born 1950), Nigerian politician
Yvonne Orji (born 1983), Nigerian-American actress
Zack Orji (born 1960s), Nigerian actor, director, producer and filmmaker

See also
Orji (given name)